Marttila is a Finnish surname. Notable people with the surname include:

 Elena Marttila (1923–2022), Russian painter of Finnish descent
 Otto Marttila (1879–1955), Finnish farmer and politician
 John Marttila (1940–2018), American political consultant and strategist

Finnish-language surnames